Shaw Heights is an unincorporated community and a census-designated place (CDP) located in and governed by Adams County, Colorado, United States. The CDP is a part of the Denver–Aurora–Lakewood, CO Metropolitan Statistical Area. The population of the Shaw Heights CDP was 5,116 at the United States Census 2010. The Westminster post office (Zip code 80031) serves the area.

Geography

Demographics

Education
Shaw Heights is served by the Westminster Public Schools.
Shaw Heights Middle School

See also

Outline of Colorado
Index of Colorado-related articles
State of Colorado
Colorado cities and towns
Colorado census designated places
Colorado counties
Adams County, Colorado
Colorado metropolitan areas
Front Range Urban Corridor
North Central Colorado Urban Area
Denver-Aurora-Boulder, CO Combined Statistical Area
Denver-Aurora-Broomfield, CO Metropolitan Statistical Area

References

External links

Westminster Public Schools
Shaw Heights Middle School
Adams County website

Census-designated places in Adams County, Colorado
Census-designated places in Colorado
Denver metropolitan area